Airling Robin Hanbury-Tenison  (born 7 May 1936) is an explorer based in Cornwall. He is President of the charity Survival International and was previously Chief Executive of The Countryside Alliance.

Early life and education
The youngest of five children born to Gerald Evan Farquhar Tenison, a Major in the 3rd Dragoon Guards, and his wife Ruth Julia Margarette Hanbury of the Pontypool Park Estate, Robin grew up on the Tenison family's historic Anglo-Irish estate Lough Bawn in Castleblayney, County Monaghan, Republic of Ireland.

He was educated at Eton College and Magdalen College, Oxford.

Personal life
In 1959, he married Marika Hopkinson. She became well known for her cookery books. They had two children, Lucy (b. 1960) and Rupert (b. 1970). Marika died in 1982.

Hanbury-Tenison and his second wife Louella (née Williams) own a 14th century farmhouse, Cabilla Manor, on Bodmin Moor, which is both their home and a bed and breakfast business. They have a son, Merlin (b. 1985).

Career
In 1957 Hanbury-Tenison was the first person to travel overland by jeep from London to Sri Lanka (then known as Ceylon). In 1958 he and Richard Mason became the first to cross South America overland at its widest point. In 1964–65 he made the first river crossing of South America from north to south from the Orinoco to Buenos Aires (at first with Sebastian Snow). In 1968 he took part in the Geographical Magazine Amazonas Expedition by Hovercraft from Manaus to the Republic of Trinidad.

Survival International
Discussions with the ethnobotanist Conrad Gorinsky led to the foundation of the charity Survival International. In 1971, as Chairman of Survival (and with Marika), he visited 33 Indian tribes in Brazil at the invitation of the Brazilian government and reported on their condition. In 1977–78 he led the Royal Geographical Society's Gunung Mulu expedition to Sarawak, the Society's largest expedition at that time, taking 115 scientists into the rainforest for 15 months.

Farming
Since 1960 Hanbury-Tenison has farmed over 2,000 acres of hill farm on Bodmin Moor in Cornwall with sheep and cattle, diversified with Angora goats, red deer and wild boar from Russia, and later farming energy from wind, solar, water and biomass.

Later career
In 1982 and 1983 he organised Capital Radio's Venture Days in Battersea Park. From 1995 to 1998 he was CEO of the British Field Sports Society, now the Countryside Alliance. He organised the Countryside Rally, which brought 130,000 people to Hyde Park in July 1997, and the Countryside March when 300,000 marched through London in 1998.

In 2015–16 he celebrated his 80th year by undertaking eight challenges, starting with the London Marathon, which raised over £80,000 for Survival International. In 2020 he spent seven weeks in hospital with COVID-19 before returning home to celebrate his 84th birthday.

Awards and achievements
 1961 RGS Ness Award
 1965–95 Commissioner of Income Tax
 1968–82 RGS Council Member, 1982–86 Vice President
 1969–81 Co-founder and Chairman of Survival International 
 1971 Winston Churchill Memorial Fellow
 1979 Patron's Medal
 1980 Winner Krug Award for Excellence
 1981 President of Survival International
 1981 Appointed Officer of the Order of the British Empire (OBE)
 1984–2015 President Camel Valley and Bodmin Moor Protection Society
 1988–95 President Cornwall Wildlife Trust
 1998 Farmers Club Cup for outstanding contribution to farming, agriculture and the countryside
 1999 Chairman Friends of Conservation
 1999 International Council for Game and Wildlife Conservation Personality of the Year 
 2001 RSGS Mungo Park Medal
 2000 Pio Manzu Medal (Italy)
 2000 CLA Contribution to the Countryside Award
 2001-5 President Rain Forest Club
 2003 Patron of the Countryside Alliance 
 2003–2011 Deputy Lieutenant for the County of Cornwall
 2009 President Cornwall Red Squirrel Project
 2012 Best Large Scale Renewable Energy Scheme in Cornwall Award for Cabilla Manor 
 2013 Exhibition of photographs of tribal people and places, National Theatre
 2014 Honorary Consul for Kosovo (Cornwall)

Books

 The Rough and the Smooth (1969)
 A Question of Survival for the Indians of Brazil (1973)
 A Pattern of Peoples: A Journey Among the Tribes of Indonesia's Outer Islands (1975)
 Mulu: Rain Forest (1980)
 Aborigines of the Amazon Rain Forest (Peoples of the Wild) (1982)
 Worlds Apart: An Explorer's Life (1984) 
 White Horses over France: From the Camargue to Cornwall (1985) 
 A Ride Along the Great Wall (1987) 
 Fragile Eden: A Ride Through New Zealand (1989) 
 Spanish Pilgrimage: A Canter to St. James (1990)
 The Oxford Book of Exploration (1993)
 Mysterious China (1995)
 Chinese Adventure: A Ride Along the Great Wall (2004)
 Worlds Within: Reflections in the Sand  (2005)
 The Seventy Great Journeys in History (2006)
 Land of Eagles: Riding Through Europe's Forgotten Country (2009)
 The Great Explorers (2010)
 The Modern Explorers, with Robert Twigger (2013)
 Echoes of a Vanished World: A Traveller's Lifetime in Pictures (2013)
 Beauty Freely Given: A Universal Truth: Artifacts from the Collection of Robin Hanbury-Tenison, with Christopher John Bowden (2013)
 Finding Eden (2017)
 Taming the Four Horsemen (2020)

For children
 Jake's Escape (1996) 
 Jake's Treasure (1997)
 Jake's Safari (1998)

Films
 A Time for Survival. Westward (1972)
 Mysteries of the Green Mountain. BBC (1978)
 Antiques at Home. BBC (1984)
 White Horses over France. BBC/FR3 (1985)
 Great Wall of China (1987)
 Odyssey series, presenter BBC (1988)
 Siberian Tigers (1994)
 Collector's Lot BBC (1998)
 The Lost World of Mulu. C4 (1999)
 Reflections in the Sand. Discovery (2000)
 Testament. Carlton (2000)
 Survival To The Brink and Back. BBC by Here Now films (2020)

References

External links

 Website
 Cabilla Manor Website
 WMN 8 Challenges Article

1936 births
Living people
Fellows of the Royal Geographical Society
Fellows of the Linnean Society of London
English explorers
Cornish people
People educated at Eton College
Alumni of Magdalen College, Oxford
English farmers
Indigenous rights activists
Officers of the Order of the British Empire